Houses from the Sea is a 1959 picture book written by Alice E Goudey and illustrated by Adrienne Adams. The book is about two children who collect seashells. The book was a recipient of a 1960 Caldecott Honor for its illustrations.

References

1959 children's books
American picture books
Caldecott Honor-winning works